= Vassar Chapel =

Church building at Vassar College

Coordinates: 41.68549°N 73.89692°W

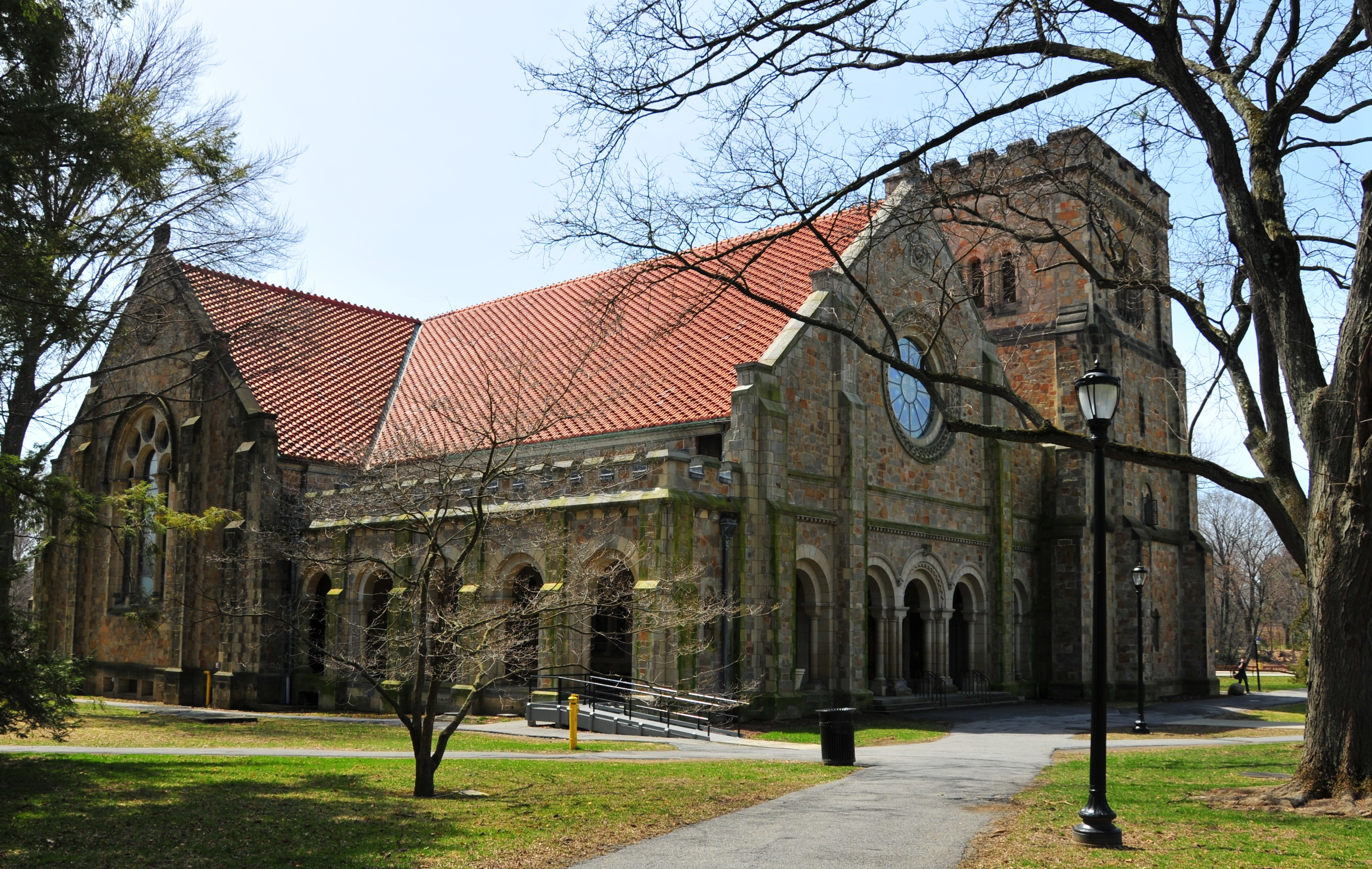
Vassar Chapel

The Vassar Chapel, built in 1904, is the main religious building at Vassar College, and is the largest religious edifice in Poughkeepsie, New York. Although it has been altered, repaired, and acoustically improved, it is one of the few buildings at Vassar that has not undergone considerable renovation. Each semester, the College community gathers in the Chapel for fall and spring convocations, in which the President and a notable member of the faculty deliver addresses.

== Architecture ==
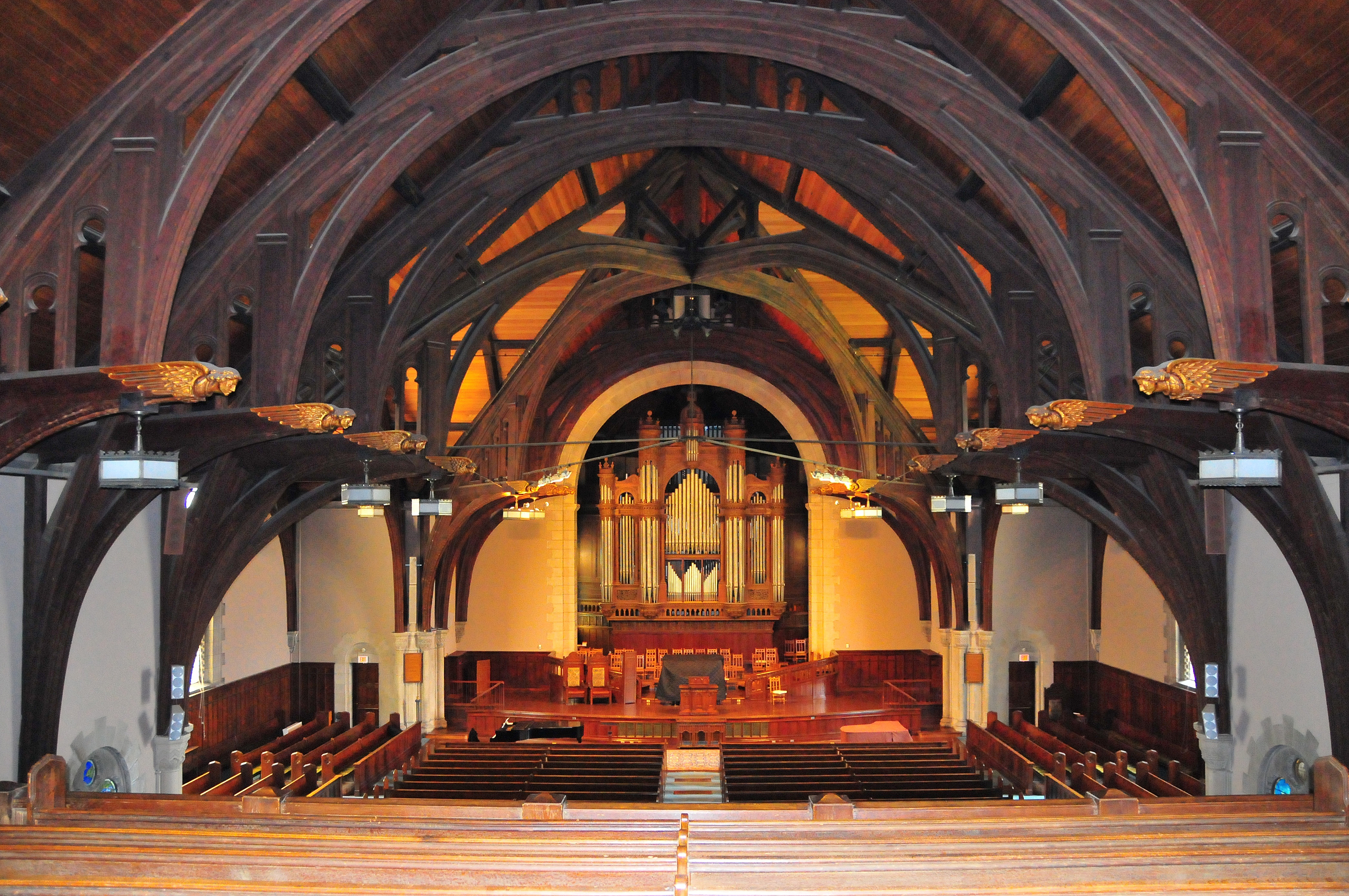
Vassar Chapel Interior

Architecturally, the style of the building is Norman, and is constructed from 'seamed' Cape Ann granite with sandstone trimmings.
